The National Film Development Corporation of India (NFDC) based in Mumbai is the central agency established in 1975, to encourage high quality Indian cinema. It functions in areas of film financing, production and distribution and under Ministry of Information and Broadcasting, Government of India. The primary goal of the NFDC is to plan, promote and organise an integrated and efficient development of the Indian Film Industry and foster excellence in cinema.

History
It was established in 1975. Over the years, NFDC has provided a wide range of services essential to the growth of Indian cinema especially Indian parallel cinema in the 1970s and 80s. The NFDC (and its predecessor the Film Finance Corporation) has so far funded or produced over 300 films. These films, in various Indian languages, have been widely acclaimed and have won many national and international awards. An example from the early 2000's is the third ever Kashmiri feature film, Bub ('father' in English), which was directed by Jyoti Sarup.

In 1982, the National Film Development Corporation of India chaired by D. V. S. Raju was also one of the production companies for Gandhi, which won eight Academy Awards

Film journalist and former editor of Filmfare, B. K. Karanjia remained the chairman of the NFDC for several years. He had been instrumental in the establishment of its predecessor, Film Finance Corporation.
Director Ramesh Sippy took over the position of chairman of NFDC in 2012. He replaced actor Om Puri who was appointed in 2008. In 2015 Suresh Gopi was appointed as the new chairman

Cinemas of India
In 2013, NFDC started its label, "Cinemas of India", specifically to promote and distribute the parallel cinema film produced by it, since the 1980s. This also includes the separate "Cinemas of India" website, many of the movies which have long been out of circulation are now restored, and available as free online streaming and also as DVDs. Notable films in the series, include Mirch Masala (1987), Ek Din Achanak (1989), Train to Pakistan (1998), Mammo (1994), Uski Roti (1969), Kamla Ki Maut (1989) and 27 Down (1974).

Awards
In capacity as the producer of various films, NFDC has received various awards.
 National Film Awards

 International awards

See also
 Children's Film Society, India
List of Indian Academy Award winners and nominees
List of Indian submissions for the Academy Award for Best Foreign Language Film

References

External links
NFDC's official site
 Cinemas of India (NFDC), website

Film distributors of India
Film organisations in India
Film production companies based in Mumbai
Organisations based in Mumbai
Entertainment companies established in 1975
Government-owned companies of India
Ministry of Information and Broadcasting (India)
Film industry in Mumbai
1975 establishments in Maharashtra
Producers who won the Best Feature Film National Film Award
Producers who won the Best Debut Feature Film of a Director National Film Award
Producers who won the Best Film on Environment Conservation/Preservation National Film Award
Producers who won the Best Film on Family Welfare National Film Award
Producers who won the Best Film on National Integration National Film Award
Producers who won the Best Film on Other Social Issues National Film Award